National Tertiary Route 753, or just Route 753 (or ) is a National Road Route of Costa Rica, located in the Alajuela province.

Description
In Alajuela province the route covers San Carlos canton (Cutris district).

References

Highways in Costa Rica